The 1998 Stroud Council election took place on 7 May 1998 to elect members of Stroud District Council in Gloucestershire, England. One third of the council was up for election and the council stayed under no overall control.

After the election, the composition of the council was
Labour 26
Conservative 10
Liberal Democrat 9
Independent 6
Green 4

Background
Before the election the Labour party ran the council, but the party had recently lost its one-seat overall majority after a vacancy in a Labour seat. 19 seats were contested in the election with Labour defending 10 seats, the Liberal Democrats 5, Green party 2 and independents 2.

Election result
The results saw no party win a majority on the council after Labour lost 1 seat to the Conservatives and 1 seat to an independent.

References

1998 English local elections
1998
1990s in Gloucestershire